Cardona may refer to:
Cardona (surname), a surname (and list of people with the surname)
Duke of Cardona, a Spanish title
Segundo Cardona, Puerto Rican architect and developer
Cardona, Rizal, a municipality in the Philippines
Cardona, Spain, a municipality in Catalonia, Spain
Cardona, Uruguay. a municipality in Uruguay
Cardona (Ponce), an island in Puerto Rico
Cardona Island Light, a lighthouse on Cardona Island